West Baden National Bank, also known as Springs Valley Bank & Trust Company, is a historic bank building located at West Baden Springs, Orange County, Indiana.  It was built in 1917, and is a two-story, Classical Revival style reinforced concrete building sheathed in yellow brick with limestone detailing.  It features a recessed entry with unfluted Ionic order columns in antis, large round-arched transom window, and a central parapet.

It was listed on the National Register of Historic Places in 1993.

References 

Hotel buildings on the National Register of Historic Places in Indiana
Neoclassical architecture in Indiana
Commercial buildings completed in 1917
Buildings and structures in Orange County, Indiana
National Register of Historic Places in Orange County, Indiana